Băsescu is a Romanian surname. Notable people with the surname include:

Traian Băsescu (born 1951), Romanian politician
Maria Băsescu (born 1951), wife of Traian
Elena Băsescu (born 1980), Romanian politician, daughter of Traian and Maria

Romanian-language surnames